Statistics of Kyrgyzstan League for the 2006 season.

Overview
It was contested by 11 teams, and Dordoi-Dynamo Naryn won the championship.

First stage

Group A

Group B

Final stage

References
Kyrgyzstan - List of final tables (RSSSF)

Kyrgyzstan League seasons
1
Kyrgyzstan
Kyrgyzstan